The Armed Forces Office or Joint Support Office is an agency of the German armed forces, the Bundeswehr, responsible for administering various joint components of the Bundeswehr. It is based in Bonn, and since the restructuring of the Bundeswehr in 2013 has been directly subordinate to the Streitkräftebasis (Joint Support Service). Its commander is a Generalmajor or Konteradmiral.

References 

Bundeswehr
Joint Support Service (Germany)